NAC Basketbal was a Dutch basketball club based in Breda. The club was the basketball section of the football club NAC Breda, which aimed to make itself a multi-sports club.

The team was founded in 2000, along with outspoken ambitions of playing in European competitions as well as in the Eredivisie. With head coach Jos Wolffs, the team finished fifth in Group A during the 2000–01 Eredivisie season. In its second season, NAC reached the playoff semi-finals. After financial problems during its second season, the club was dissolved in April 2002.

Season by season

References

Defunct basketball teams in the Netherlands
Basketball teams established in 2000
Basketball teams disestablished in 2002
Former Dutch Basketball League teams
Sports clubs in North Brabant
NAC Breda